Domenico di Cecco may refer to:

Domenico Di Cecco (footballer), Italian footballer
Domenico di Cecco, 15th-century painter from Gubbio